Real Madrid TV is a free digital television channel, operated by Real Madrid specialising in the Spanish football club. The channel is available in Spanish and English. It is located at Ciudad Real Madrid in Valdebebas (Madrid), Real Madrid's training centre.

Content
RMTV broadcasts interviews with players and staff, full matches, including all La Liga games, news and games of the Real Madrid basketball team, live matches of the reserve and academy games and "classic" matches plus footballing news and other themed programming. The station also broadcasts all of the team's pre-season friendly matches.

External links

Real Madrid TV at LyngSat Address

Real Madrid CF
Television stations in Spain
Television stations in the Community of Madrid
Sports mass media in Spain
Sports television in Spain
Television channels and stations established in 2005
Mass media in Madrid
Football club television channels